Enrique Vizcarra Luna (born 24 December 1975) is a Mexican retired footballer who played as a defender or midfielder.

External links
 

Living people
1975 births
Footballers from Coahuila
Mexican footballers
Sportspeople from Torreón
Association football utility players
Santos Laguna footballers
Deportivo Toluca F.C. players
Atlético Morelia players
Lobos BUAP footballers
Club Puebla players
Alacranes de Durango footballers
Liga MX players
Ascenso MX players